Ismail Aden Rage (born 3 January 1953) is a Tanzanian CCM politician and Member of Parliament for Bukene constituency since 2010.

References

1953 births
Living people
Chama Cha Mapinduzi MPs
Tanzanian MPs 2010–2015
Uyui Secondary School alumni
College of Business Education alumni